Seniški Breg is a dispersed settlement in the hills above Avče in the Municipality of Kanal ob Soči in the Littoral region of Slovenia.

References

External links
Seniški Breg on Geopedia

Populated places in the Municipality of Kanal